Shanta Rao (c. 1925- 28 December 2007) was a notable dancer from India. She studied and performed Kathakali, Bharatanatyam and Kuchipudi.

She was a recipient of the Padma Shri, Sangeet Natak Akademi Award and Kalidas Samman for Classical Dance.

She was born in 1925 in Bombay, and lived in Mumbai and Bangalore. She hailed from Mangalore. She died on 28 December 2007 at her home at Malleswaram, Bangalore.

Life and career 
Shanta Rao was born around 1925 to Saraswat Brahmins, who were an honourable family in Bombay. She wished to pursue Kathakali but faced opposition at an early age. Eventually, she went on to develop a passion for classical traditions away from an urban setup. She rejected the ideology of mainstream schooling to pursue dance. Rao traveled to Kerala Kalamandalam with a chaperone, G. Venkatachalam, in the year 1939. The proprietor of Kerala Kalamandalam was a poet named Vallathol Narayan Menon.

P. Ravunni Menon, a Guru from Kalamandalam, was taken by surprise at the sight of a young girl wanting to participate in a masculine art form like Kathakali. Shanta Rao was one of the first female pioneers of Kathakali who challenged the traditional norms of classical dance. In the Kalamandalam, Shanta had the opportunity to meet the last great Guru of Mohini Attam, Krishna Panikkar, who eventually endowed his legacy of movements and music. She made her debut in Kathakali in 1940 in front of an audience of Namboodiris and Kathakali experts in Thrissur.

Shanta Rao learnt Bharatanatyam from Meenakshi Sundaram Pillai. She made her debut in Bharatnatyam in the Music Academy of Madras in 1942.  Rao explored the dance form Kuchipudi under Vempati Chinna Satyam when she was believed to be in her 50s. She formulated Bhama Natyam, inspired and influenced by Venkatachalapathi Sastri, who introduced her to Bhamasutram rituals. Sastri entrusted and blessed her with the sanctity of the art.

Performances 

 Sangeet Natak Akademi's Swarna Jayanti Mahotsava, celebrating India's 50th year of independence, organised in Delhi in 1997.
 Ashta Mahishi, a two-hour Bhama Natyam  composition recounting legends of the eight wives of Lord Krishna.-  (June 2006)

Awards and achievements 

 Padma Shri by the Government of India, 1971
 Sangeet Natak Akademi - given by Sangeet Natak Akademi, India's National Academy for Music, Dance and Drama, 1970 
 Kalidas Samman for Classical Dance of Government of Madhya Pradesh, 1993-94

Bibliography

References

Indian female classical dancers
Performers of Indian classical dance
1930 births
2007 deaths
Artists from Mangalore
Bharatanatyam exponents
Artists from Bangalore
Articles created or expanded during Women's History Month (India) - 2014
Recipients of the Padma Shri in arts
Recipients of the Sangeet Natak Akademi Award
Kuchipudi exponents
Kathakali exponents
Dancers from Karnataka
20th-century Indian dancers
20th-century Indian women artists
Women artists from Karnataka